The geography of Croatia is defined by its location—it is described as a part of Central Europe and Southeast Europe, a part of the Balkans and Southern Europe.

The Pannonian Basin and the Dinaric Alps, along with the Adriatic Basin, represent major geomorphological parts of Croatia. Most of the lowlands are found in the northern regions, especially in Slavonia, itself a part of the Pannonian Basin plain. The plains are interspersed with horst and graben structures, believed to have broken the Pliocene Pannonian Sea's surface as islands. The greatest concentration of ground at relatively high elevations is found in the Lika and Gorski Kotar areas in the Dinaric Alps, but high areas are found in all regions of Croatia to some extent. Karst topography makes up about half of Croatia and is especially prominent in the Dinaric Alps, as well as throughout the coastal areas and the islands.

62% of Croatia's territory is encompassed by the Black Sea drainage basin. The area includes the largest rivers flowing in the country: the Danube, Sava, Drava, Mur and Kupa. The remainder belongs to the Adriatic Sea drainage basin, where the largest river by far is the Neretva. Most of Croatia has a moderately warm and rainy continental climate as defined by the Köppen climate classification. Croatia has a number of ecoregions because of its climate and geomorphology, and the country is consequently among the most biodiverse in Europe. There are four types of biogeographical regions in Croatia: Mediterranean along the coast and in its immediate hinterland; Alpine in the elevated Lika and Gorski Kotar; Pannonian along the Drava and Danube; and Continental in the remaining areas. There are 444 protected natural areas in Croatia, encompassing 8.5% of the country; there are about 37,000 known species in Croatia, and the total number of species is estimated to be between 50,000 and 100,000.

The permanent population of Croatia by the 2011 census reached 4.29 million. The population density was 75.8 inhabitants per square kilometre, and the overall life expectancy in Croatia at birth was 75.7 years. The country is inhabited mostly by Croats (89.6%), while minorities include Serbs (4.5%), and 21 other ethnicities (less than 1% each) recognised by the constitution. Since the counties were re-established in 1992, Croatia is divided into 20 counties and the capital city of Zagreb. The counties subdivide into 127 cities and 429 municipalities. The average urbanisation rate in Croatia stands at 56%, with a growing urban population and shrinking rural population. The largest city and the nation's capital is Zagreb, with an urban population of 797,952 in the city itself and a metropolitan area population of 978,161. The populations of Split and Rijeka exceed 100,000, and five more cities in Croatia have populations over 50,000.

Area and borders
The physical geography of Croatia is defined by its location—it is described as a part of Southeast Europe. Croatia borders Bosnia–Herzegovina (for 1,009.1 km) and Serbia (for 317.6 km) in the east, Slovenia for 667.8 km in the west, Hungary for 355.5 km in the north and Montenegro for 22.6 km and the Adriatic Sea in the south. It lies mostly between latitudes 42° and 47° N and longitudes 13° and 20° E. Part of the extreme south of Croatia is separated from the rest of the mainland by a short coastline strip around Neum belonging to Bosnia–Herzegovina. The country's shape is described as a 'horseshoe', and it arose as a result of medieval geopolitics.

Croatia's  border with Hungary was inherited from Yugoslavia. Much of the border with Hungary follows the Drava River or its former river bed; that part of the border dates from the Middle Ages. The border in Međimurje and Baranya was defined as a border between the Kingdom of Hungary and the Kingdom of Serbs, Croats, and Slovenes, later renamed the Kingdom of Yugoslavia, pursuant to the Treaty of Trianon of 1920. The present outline of the  border with Bosnia–Herzegovina and  border with Montenegro is largely the result of the Ottoman conquest and subsequent recapture of territories in the Great Turkish War of 1667–1698 formally ending with the Treaty of Karlowitz, as well as the Fifth and Seventh Ottoman–Venetian Wars. This border had minor modifications in 1947 when all borders of the former Yugoslav constituent republics were defined by demarcation commissions implementing the AVNOJ decisions of 1943 and 1945 regarding the federal organisation of Yugoslavia. The commissions also defined Baranya and Međimurje as Croatian territories, and moreover set up the present-day  border between Serbia and Croatia in Syrmia and along the Danube River between Ilok and the Drava river's mouth and further north to the Hungarian border; the Ilok/Drava section matched the border between the Kingdom of Croatia-Slavonia and Bács-Bodrog County that existed until 1918 (the end of World War I). Most of the  border with Slovenia was also defined by the commissions, matching the northwestern border of the Kingdom of Croatia-Slavonia, and establishing a new section of Croatian border north of the Istrian peninsula according to the ethnic composition of the territory previously belonging to the Kingdom of Italy.

Pursuant to the 1947 Treaty of Peace with Italy the islands of Cres, Lastovo and Palagruža and the cities of Zadar and Rijeka and most of Istria went to communist Yugoslavia and Croatia, while carving out the Free Territory of Trieste (FTT) as a city-state. The FTT was partitioned in 1954 as Trieste itself and the area to the north of it were placed under Italian control, and the rest under Yugoslav control. The arrangement was made permanent by the Treaty of Osimo in 1975. The former FTT's Yugoslav part was partitioned between Croatia and Slovenia, largely conforming to the area population's ethnic composition.

In the late 19th century, Austria-Hungary established a geodetic network, for which the elevation benchmark was determined by the Adriatic Sea's average level at the Sartorio pier in Trieste. This benchmark was subsequently retained by Austria, adopted by Yugoslavia, and kept by the states that emerged after its dissolution, including Croatia.

Extreme points

The geographical extreme points of Croatia are Žabnik in Međimurje County as the northernmost point, Rađevac near Ilok in Vukovar-Syrmia County as the easternmost point, Cape Lako near Bašanija in Istria County as the westernmost point and the islet of Galijula in Palagruža archipelago in Split-Dalmatia County as the southernmost point. On the mainland, Cape Oštra of the Prevlaka peninsula in Dubrovnik-Neretva County is the southernmost point.

Maritime claims

Italy and Yugoslavia defined their delineation of the continental shelf in the Adriatic Sea in 1968, with an additional agreement on the boundary in the Gulf of Trieste signed in 1975 in accordance with the Treaty of Osimo. All the successor states of former Yugoslavia accepted the agreements. Prior to Yugoslavia's break-up, Albania, Italy and Yugoslavia initially proclaimed  territorial waters, subsequently reduced to the international-standard ; all sides adopted baseline systems. Croatia also declared its Ecological and Fisheries Protection Zone (ZERP)—a part of its Exclusive Economic Zone—as extending to the continental shelf boundary. Croatia's territorial waters encompass ; its internal waters located within the baseline cover an additional .

Border disputes

Maritime border disputes
Croatia and Slovenia started negotiations to define maritime borders in the Gulf of Piran in 1992 but failed to agree, resulting in a dispute. Both countries also declared their economic zones, which partially overlap. Croatia's application to become an EU member state was initially suspended pending resolution of its border disputes with Slovenia. These were eventually settled with an agreement to accept the decision of an international arbitration commission set up via the UN, enabling Croatia to progress towards EU membership. The dispute has caused no major practical problems in areas other than the EU membership negotiations progress, even before the arbitration agreement.

The maritime boundary between Bosnia–Herzegovina and Croatia was formally settled in 1999, but a few issues are still contested—the Klek peninsula and two islets in the border area. The Croatia–Montenegro maritime boundary is disputed in the Bay of Kotor, at the Prevlaka peninsula. The situation was exacerbated by the peninsula's occupation by the Yugoslav People's Army and later by the Serbian-Montenegrin army, which in turn was replaced by a United Nations observer mission that lasted until 2002. Croatia took over the area with an agreement that allowed Montenegrin presence in Croatian waters in the bay, and the dispute has become far less contentious since the independence of Montenegro in 2006.

Land border disputes
The land border disputes pertain to comparatively small strips of land. The Croatia–Slovenia border disputes are: along the Dragonja River's lower course where Slovenia claims three hamlets on the river's left bank; the Sveta Gera peak of Žumberak where exact territorial claims were never made and appear to be limited to a military barracks on the peak itself; and along the Mura River where Slovenia wants the border to be along the current river bed instead of along a former one and claims a (largely if not completely uninhabited) piece of land near Hotiza. These claims are likewise in the process of being settled by binding arbitration.

There are also land border disputes between Croatia and Serbia. The two countries presently control one bank of the present-day river each, but Croatia claims that the border line should follow the cadastral borders between the former municipalities of SR Croatia and SR Serbia along the Danube, as defined by a Yugoslav commission in 1947 (effectively following a former river bed); borders claimed by Croatia also include the Vukovar and Šarengrad islands in the Danube as its territory. There is also a border dispute with Bosnia–Herzegovina, specifically Croatia claims Unčica channel on the right bank of Una as the border at Hrvatska Kostajnica, while Bosnia and Herzegovina claims Una River course as the border there.

Physical geography

Geology

The geology of Croatia has some Precambrian rocks mostly covered by younger sedimentary rocks and deformed or superimposed by tectonic activity.

The country is split into two main onshore provinces, a smaller part of the Pannonian Basin and the larger Dinarides. These areas are very different.

The carbonate platform karst landscape of Croatia helped to create the weathering conditions to form bauxite, gypsum, clay, amphibolite, granite, spilite, gabbro, diabase and limestone.

Topography

Most of the lowlands are found in the country's northern regions, especially in Slavonia, representing a part of the Pannonian Basin. The greatest concentration of ground at relatively high elevations is found in the Lika and Gorski Kotar areas in the Dinaric Alps, but such areas are found in all regions of Croatia to some extent. The Pannonian Basin and the Dinaric Alps, along with the Adriatic Basin, represent major geomorphological parts of Croatia.

Adriatic Basin

The number of islands includes all islands, islets, and rocks of all sizes, including ones emerging only at low tide. The islands include 47 permanently inhabited ones, the most populous among them being Krk and Korčula.

The shore is the most indented coastline in the Mediterranean. The majority of the coast is characterised by a karst topography, developed from the Adriatic Carbonate Platform. It is estimated that some karst formations are related to earlier drops of sea level, most notably the Messinian salinity crisis. The eastern coast's largest part consists of carbonate rocks, while flysch rock is significantly represented in the Gulf of Trieste coast, on the Kvarner Gulf coast opposite Krk, and in Dalmatia north of Split. There are comparably small alluvial areas of the Adriatic coast in Croatia—most notably the Neretva river delta.

In the Middle Adriatic Basin, there is evidence of Permian volcanism in the area of Komiža on the island of Vis, in addition to the volcanic islands of Jabuka and Brusnik. Earthquakes are frequent in the area around the Adriatic Sea, although most are too faint to be felt; an earthquake doing significant damage happens every few decades, with major earthquakes every few centuries.

Dinaric Alps

The Dinaric Alps are linked to a Late Jurassic to recent times fold and thrust belt, itself part of the Alpine orogeny, extending southeast from the southern Alps. The Dinaric Alps in Croatia encompass the entire Gorski Kotar and Lika regions, as well as considerable parts of Dalmatia, with their northeastern edge running from  Žumberak to the Banovina region, along the Sava River, and their westernmost landforms being  Ćićarija and  Učka mountains in Istria. The Dinaric Alps contain the highest mountain in Croatia— Dinara—as well as all other mountains in Croatia higher than : Biokovo, Velebit, Plješivica, Velika Kapela, Risnjak, Svilaja and Snježnik.

Karst topography makes up about half of Croatia and is especially prominent in the Dinaric Alps.

Pannonian Basin

The Pannonian Basin took shape through Miocenian thinning and subsidence of crust structures formed during the Late Paleozoic Variscan orogeny. The Paleozoic and Mesozoic structures are visible in Papuk and other Slavonian mountains. The processes also led to the formation of a stratovolcanic chain in the basin 12–17 Mya; intensified subsidence was observed until 5 Mya as well as flood basalts at about 7.5 Mya. The contemporary tectonic uplift of the Carpathian Mountains severed water flow to the Black Sea and the Pannonian Sea formed in the basin. Sediments were transported to the basin from the uplifting Carpathian and Dinaric mountains, with particularly deep fluvial sediments being deposited in the Pleistocene epoch during the Transdanubian Mountains' formation.

The results are large plains in eastern Slavonia's Baranya and Syrmia regions, as well as in river valleys, especially along the Sava, Drava and Kupa. The plains are interspersed by horst and graben structures, believed to have broken the Pannonian Sea's surface as islands.  The tallest among such landforms are  Ivanšćica and  Medvednica north of Zagreb—both are also at least partially in Hrvatsko Zagorje—as well as  Psunj and  Papuk that are the tallest among the Slavonian mountains surrounding Požega. Psunj, Papuk and adjacent Krndija consist mostly of Paleozoic rocks from 300 to 350 Mya. Požeška gora, adjacent to Psunj, consists of much more recent Neogene rocks, but there are also Upper Cretaceous sediments and igneous rocks forming the main,  ridge of the hill; these represent the largest igneous landform in Croatia. A smaller piece of igneous terrain is also present on Papuk, near Voćin. The two, as well as the Moslavačka gora mountains, are possibly remnants of a volcanic arc from the same tectonic plate collision that caused the Dinaric Alps.

Hydrography

The largest part of Croatia—62% of its territory—is encompassed by the Black Sea drainage basin. The area includes the largest rivers flowing in the country: the Danube, Sava, Drava, Mura and Kupa. The rest belongs to the Adriatic Sea drainage basin, where the largest river by far is the Neretva. The longest rivers in Croatia are the  Sava,  Drava,  Kupa and a  section of the Danube. The longest rivers emptying into the Adriatic Sea are the  Cetina and an only  section of the Neretva.

The largest lakes in Croatia are  Lake Vrana located in the northern Dalmatia,  Lake Dubrava near Varaždin,  Peruća Lake (reservoir) on the Cetina River,  Lake Prokljan near Skradin and  Lake Varaždin reservoir through which the Drava River flows near Varaždin. Croatia's most famous lakes are the Plitvice lakes, a system of 16 lakes with waterfalls connecting them over dolomite and limestone cascades. The lakes are renowned for their distinctive colours, ranging from turquoise to mint green, grey or blue. Croatia has a remarkable wealth in terms of wetlands. Four of those are included in the Ramsar list of internationally important wetlands: Lonjsko Polje along the Sava and Lonja rivers near Sisak, Kopački Rit at the confluence of the Drava and Danube, the Neretva Delta and Crna Mlaka near Jastrebarsko.

Climate

Most of Croatia has a moderately warm and rainy oceanic climate (Cfb) as defined by the Köppen climate classification. The coldest parts of the country are Lika and Gorski Kotar where a snowy forested climate is found at elevations above . The warmest areas of Croatia are at the Adriatic coast and especially in its immediate hinterland, which are characterised by a Mediterranean climate since temperatures are moderated by the sea.

The mean annual precipitation is  depending on the geographic region and prevailing climate type. The least precipitation is recorded in the outer islands (Vis, Lastovo, Biševo, and Svetac) and in the eastern parts of Slavonia; however, in the latter case it is mostly during the growing season. The most precipitation is observed on the Dinara mountain range and in Gorski Kotar, where some of the highest annual precipitation totals in Europe occur.

The prevailing winds in the interior are light to moderate northeast or southwest; in the coastal area, the prevailing winds are determined by local area features. Higher wind velocities are more often recorded in cooler months along the coast, generally as cool northeasterly buras or, less frequently, as warm southerly jugos. The sunniest parts of the country are the outer islands, Hvar and Korčula, where more than 2,700 hours of sunshine are recorded per year, followed by the southern Adriatic Sea area in general, northern Adriatic coast, and Slavonia, all with more than 2,000 hours of sunshine per year.

Biodiversity

Croatia can be subdivided between a number of ecoregions because of its climate and geomorphology, and the country is consequently one of the richest in Europe in terms of biodiversity. There are four types of biogeographical regions in Croatia: Mediterranean along the coast and in its immediate hinterland, Alpine in most of Lika and Gorski Kotar, Pannonian along the Drava and Danube, and continental in the remaining areas. Among the most significant are karst habitats; these include submerged karst, such as Zrmanja and Krka canyons and tufa barriers, as well as underground habitats. The karst geology has produced approximately 7,000 caves and pits, many of which are inhabited by troglobitic (exclusively cave-dwelling) animals such as the olm, a cave salamander and the only European troglobitic vertebrate. Forests are also significant in the country, as they cover  representing 46.8% of Croatia's land surface. The other habitat types include wetlands, grasslands, bogs, fens, scrub habitats, coastal and marine habitats. In terms of phytogeography, Croatia is part of the Boreal Kingdom; specifically, it is part of the Illyrian and Central European provinces of the Circumboreal Region and the Adriatic province of the Mediterranean Region. The World Wide Fund for Nature divides land in Croatia into three ecoregions—Pannonian mixed forests, Dinaric Mountains mixed forests and Illyrian deciduous forests. Biomes in Croatia include temperate broadleaf/mixed forest and Mediterranean forests, woodlands and scrub; all are in the Palearctic realm.

Croatia has 38,226 known taxa, 2.8% of which are endemic; the actual number (including undiscovered species) is estimated to be between 50,000 and 100,000. The estimate is supported by nearly 400 new taxa of invertebrates discovered in Croatia in 2000–2005 alone. There are more than a thousand endemic species, especially in the Velebit and Biokovo mountains, Adriatic islands and karst rivers. Legislation protects 1,131 species. Indigenous cultivars of plants and breeds of domesticated animals are also numerous; they include five breeds of horses, five breeds of cattle, eight breeds of sheep, two breeds of pigs and a poultry breed. Even the indigenous breeds include nine endangered or critically endangered ones.

There are 444 Croatian protected areas, encompassing 8.5% of the country. These include 8 national parks, 2 strict reserves and 11 nature parks, accounting for 78% of the total protected area. The most famous protected area and the oldest national park in Croatia is the Plitvice Lakes National Park, a UNESCO World Heritage Site. Velebit Nature Park is a part of the UNESCO Man and the Biosphere Programme. The strict and special reserves, as well as the national and nature parks, are managed and protected by the central government, while other protected areas are managed by counties. In 2005, the National Ecological Network was set up as the first step in preparation for EU membership and joining the Natura 2000 network.

Habitat destruction represents a threat to biodiversity in Croatia, as developed and agricultural land is expanded into previous natural habitats, while habitat fragmentation occurs as roads are created or expanded. A further threat to biodiversity is the introduction of invasive species, with Caulerpa racemosa and C. taxifolia identified as especially problematic ones. The invasive algae are monitored and regularly removed to protect the benthic habitat. Agricultural monocultures have also been identified as a threat to biodiversity.

Ecology

The ecological footprint of Croatia's population and industry varies significantly between the country's regions since 50% of the population resides in 26.8% of the nation's territory, with a particularly high impact made by the city of Zagreb and Zagreb County areas—their combined area comprises 6.6% of Croatia's territory while encompassing 25% of the population. The ecological footprint is most notably from the increased development of settlements and the sea coast leading to habitat fragmentation. Between 1998 and 2008, the greatest changes of land use pertained to artificially developed areas, but the scale of development is negligible compared to EU member states.

The Croatian Environment Agency (CEA), a public institution established by the Government of Croatia to collect and analyse information on the environment, has identified further ecological problems as well as various degrees of progress in terms of curbing their environmental impact. These problems include inadequate legal landfills as well as the presence of illegal landfills; between 2005 and 2008, 62 authorised and 423 illegal landfills were rehabilitated. The processes of soil acidification and organic matter degradation are present throughout Croatia, with increasing soil salinity levels in the Neretva river plain and spreading areas of alkali soil in Slavonia.

Croatian air pollution levels reflect the drop in industrial production recorded in 1991 at the onset of the Croatian War of Independence—pre-war emission levels were only reached in 1997. The use of desulfurised fuels has led to a 25% reduction of sulphur dioxide emissions between 1997 and 2004, and a further 7.2% drop by 2007. The rise in NOx emissions halted in 2007 and reversed in 2008. The use of unleaded petrol reduced emissions of lead into the atmosphere by 91.5% between 1997 and 2004. Air quality measurements indicate that the air in rural areas is essentially clean, and in urban centres it generally complies with legal requirements. The most significant sources of  greenhouse gas (GHG) emissions in Croatia are energy production (72%), industry (13%) and agriculture (11%). The average annual increase of GHG emissions is 3%, remaining within the Kyoto Protocol limits. Between 1990 and 2007, the use of ozone depleting substances was reduced by 92%; their use is expected to be abolished by 2015.

Even though Croatia has sufficient water resources at its disposal, these are not uniformly distributed and public water supply network losses remain high—estimated at 44%. Between 2004 and 2008, the number of stations monitoring surface water pollution increased by 20%; the CEA reported 476 cases of water pollution in this period. At the same time organic waste pollution levels decreased slightly, which is attributed to the completion of new sewage treatment plants; their number increased 20%, reaching a total of 101. Nearly all of Croatia's groundwater aquifers are top quality, unlike the available surface water; the latter's quality varies in terms of biochemical oxygen demand and bacteriological water analysis results. As of 2008, 80% of the Croatian population are served by the public water supply system, but only 44% of the population have access to the public sewerage network, with septic systems in use. Adriatic Sea water quality monitoring between 2004 and 2008 indicated very good, oligotrophic conditions along most of the coast, while areas of increased eutrophication were identified in the Bay of Bakar, the Bay of Kaštela, the Port of Šibenik and near Ploče; other areas of localised pollution were identified near the larger coastal cities. In the period between 2004 and 2008, the CEA identified 283 cases of marine pollution (including 128 from vessels), which was a drop of 15% relative to the period encompassed by the previous report, 1997 to August 2005.

Land use

Artificial surfaces (primarily consisting of urban areas, roads, non-agricultural vegetation, sports areas and other recreational facilities) took up  or 3.1% of the country's area. The greatest impetus for land use changes is the expansion of settlements and road construction.

Because of the Croatian War of Independence, there are numerous leftover minefields in Croatia, largely tracing former front lines. As of 2006, suspected minefields covered . As of 2012, 62% of the remaining minefields are situated in forests, 26% of them are found in agricultural land, and 12% are found in other land; it is expected that mine clearance will be complete by 2019.

Regions

Croatia is traditionally divided into numerous, often overlapping geographic regions, whose borders are not always clearly defined. The largest and most readily recognisable ones throughout the country are Central Croatia (also described as the Zagreb macro-region), Eastern Croatia (largely corresponding with Slavonia), and Mountainous Croatia (Lika and Gorski Kotar; to the west of Central Croatia). These three comprise the inland or continental part of Croatia. Coastal Croatia consists of a further two regions: Dalmatia or the southern littoral, between the general area of the city of Zadar and the southernmost tip of the country; and the northern littoral located north of Dalmatia, encompassing the Croatian Littoral and Istria. The geographical regions generally do not conform to county boundaries or other administrative divisions, and all of them encompass further, more specific, geographic regions.

Human geography

Demographics

The demographic features of the Croatian population are known through censuses, normally conducted in ten-year intervals and analysed by various statistical bureaus since the 1850s. The Croatian Bureau of Statistics has performed this task since the 1990s. The latest census in Croatia was performed in April 2011. The permanent population of Croatia at the 2011 census had reached 4.29 million. The population density was 75.8 inhabitants per square kilometre, and the overall life expectancy in Croatia at birth is 75.7 years. The population rose steadily (with the exception of censuses taken following the two world wars) from 2.1 million in 1857 until 1991, when it peaked at 4.7 million. Since 1991, Croatia's death rate has continuously exceeded its birth rate; the natural growth rate of the population is thus currently negative. Croatia is currently in the demographic transition's fourth or fifth stage. In terms of age structure, the population is dominated by the 15‑ to 64‑year‑old segment. The median age of the population is 41.4, and the gender ratio of the total population is 0.93 males per 1 female.

Croatia is inhabited mostly by Croats (89.6%), while minorities include Serbs (4.5%) and 21 other ethnicities (less than 1% each) recognised by the Constitution of Croatia. The demographic history of Croatia is marked by significant migrations, including: the Croats' arrival in the area; the growth of the Hungarian and German speaking population after the personal union of Croatia and Hungary; joining of the Habsburg Empire; migrations set off by the Ottoman conquests; and the growth of the Italian-speaking population in Istria and Dalmatia during the Venetian rule there. After Austria-Hungary's collapse, the Hungarian population declined, while the German-speaking population was forced out or fled during the last part of and after World War II, and a similar fate was suffered by the Italian population. The late 19th century and the 20th century were marked by large scale economic migrations abroad. The 1940s and the 1950s in Yugoslavia were marked by internal migrations in Yugoslavia, as well as by urbanisation. The most recent significant migrations came as a result of the Croatian War of Independence when hundreds of thousands were displaced.

The Croatian language is Croatia's official language, but the languages of constitutionally-recognised minorities are officially used in some local government units. Croatian is the native language identified by 96% of the population. A 2009 survey revealed that 78% of Croatians claim knowledge of at least one foreign language—most often English. The largest religions of Croatia are Roman Catholicism (86.3%), Orthodox Christianity (4.4%) and Islam (1.5%). Literacy in Croatia stands at 98.1%. The proportion of the population aged 15 and over attaining academic degrees has grown rapidly since 2001, doubling and reaching 16.7% by 2008. An estimated 4.5% of GDP is spent for education. Primary and secondary education are available in Croatian and in the languages of recognised minorities. Croatia has a universal health care system and in 2010, the nation spent 6.9% of its GDP on healthcare. The net monthly income in September 2011 averaged 5,397 kuna. The most significant sources of employment in 2008 were wholesale and retail trade, the manufacturing industry and construction. In October 2011, the unemployment rate was 17.4%. Croatia's median equivalent household income tops the average Purchasing Power Standard of the ten countries which joined the EU in 2004, while trailing the EU average. The 2011 census recorded a total of 1.5 million private households; most owned their own housing.

Political geography

Croatia was first subdivided into counties in the Middle Ages. The divisions changed over time to reflect losses of territory to Ottoman conquest and subsequent liberation of the same territory, in addition to changes in the political status of Dalmatia, Dubrovnik and Istria. The traditional division of the country into counties was abolished in the 1920s, when the Kingdom of Serbs, Croats and Slovenes and the subsequent Kingdom of Yugoslavia introduced oblasts and banovinas respectively.  Communist-ruled Croatia, as a constituent part of post-WWII Yugoslavia, abolished earlier divisions and introduced (mostly rural) municipalities, subdividing Croatia into approximately one hundred municipalities. Counties were reintroduced in 1992 by legislation, significantly altered in terms of territory relative to the pre-1920s subdivisions—for instance, in 1918 the Transleithanian part of Croatia was divided into eight counties with their seats in Bjelovar, Gospić, Ogulin, Požega, Vukovar, Varaždin, Osijek and Zagreb, while the 1992 legislation established 14 counties in the same territory. Međimurje County was established in the eponymous region acquired through the 1920 Treaty of Trianon. (The 1990 Croatian Constitution provided for a Chamber of the Counties as part of the government, and for counties themselves without specifying their names or number. However, the counties were not actually re-established until 1992, and the first Chamber of the Counties was elected in 1993.)

Since the counties were re-established in 1992, Croatia has been divided into 20 counties and the capital city of Zagreb, the latter having the authority and legal status of a county and a city at the same time (Zagreb County outside the city is administratively separate as of 1997). The county borders have changed in some instances since (for reasons such as historical ties and requests by cities), with the latest revision taking place in 2006. The counties subdivide into 127 cities and 429 municipalities.

The EU Nomenclature of Territorial Units for Statistics (NUTS) division of Croatia is performed in several tiers. NUTS 1 level places the entire country in a single unit, while there are three NUTS 2 regions; these are Central and Eastern (Pannonian) Croatia, Northwest Croatia and Adriatic Croatia. The last encompasses all counties along the Adriatic coast. Northwest Croatia includes the city of Zagreb and Krapina-Zagorje, Varaždin, Koprivnica-Križevci, Međimurje and Zagreb counties, and the Central and Eastern (Pannonian) Croatia includes the remaining areas—Bjelovar-Bilogora, Virovitica-Podravina, Požega-Slavonia, Brod-Posavina, Osijek-Baranja, Vukovar-Syrmia, Karlovac and Sisak-Moslavina counties. Individual counties and the city of Zagreb represent NUTS 3 level subdivision units in Croatia. The NUTS Local administrative unit divisions are two-tiered. The LAU 1 divisions match the counties and the city of Zagreb—in effect making these the same as NUTS 3 units—while the LAU 2 subdivisions correspond to the cities and municipalities of Croatia.

Urbanisation

The average urbanisation rate in Croatia stands at 56%, with a growing urban population and shrinking rural population. The largest city and the nation's capital is Zagreb, with an urban population of 686,568 in the city itself. Zagreb's metropolitan area encompasses 341 additional settlements and, by the year 2001, the population of the area had reached 978,161; approximately 60% of Zagreb County's residents live in Zagreb's metropolitan area, as does about 41% of Croatia's urban population. The cities of Split and Rijeka are the largest settlements on the Croatian Adriatic coast, with each city's population being over 100,000. There are four other Croatian cities exceeding 50,000 people: Osijek, Zadar, Pula and Slavonski Brod; the Zagreb district of Sesvete, which has the status of a standalone settlement but not a city, also has such a large population. A further eleven cities are populated by more than 20,000.

See also

 Geography of Europe

References

Works cited

External links